Old Desolate is a  multi-summit, ridge-like mountain located in Mount Rainier National Park, in Pierce County of Washington state. It is part of the Cascade Range, and lies  due north of the summit of Mount Rainier. The Wonderland Trail provides an approach to this mountain, and the summit offers views of Sluiskin Mountain and Mount Rainier. Burroughs Mountain is its nearest higher neighbor,  to the southeast. Precipitation runoff from Old Desolate drains east into the West Fork White River, or west into the Carbon River.

History
The descriptive name Old Desolate derives from its position standing desolate and alone at the western edge of Vernal Park. The name was officially adopted in 1932 by the United States Board on Geographic Names, which noted that there were three peaks on the mountain, with elevations of 7,130-feet for the central peak, 7,003-ft for the south peak, and 7,004-ft for the north one, and the north and south peaks being a mile apart.

Climate

Old Desolate is located in the marine west coast climate zone of western North America. Most weather fronts originate in the Pacific Ocean, and travel northeast toward the Cascade Mountains. As fronts approach, they are forced upward by the peaks of the Cascade Range (Orographic lift), causing them to drop their moisture in the form of rain or snowfall onto the Cascades. As a result, the west side of the Cascades experiences high precipitation, especially during the winter months in the form of snowfall. During winter months, weather is usually cloudy, but, due to high pressure systems over the Pacific Ocean that intensify during summer months, there is often little or no cloud cover during the summer. The months July through September offer the most favorable weather for viewing or climbing this peak.

See also

 Geology of the Pacific Northwest

Gallery

References

External links
 National Park Service web site: Mount Rainier National Park
 Old Desolate: weather forecast

Cascade Range
Mountains of Pierce County, Washington
Mountains of Washington (state)
Mount Rainier National Park
North American 2000 m summits